Muhamad Khalid bin Jamlus (born 23 February 1977) is a retired Malaysian footballer. He is a former member of the Malaysian national team and also has played for the Pre-Olympic squad. In 2002, he went on trial with Eintracht Frankfurt. He is widely regarded as one of the best striker of Perak FA and was the club's all-time top goalscorer.

Career 
Khalid first played for Perak FA President's Cup Team before being selected to join the Olympic 2000. After Olympic 2000 was disbanded, he left to play for his former club. During his first stint with Perak FA, he was a crowd favourite. However, doubts about his work-rate persisted throughout his stint with the Seladang. In 2005, Khalid signed for Selangor FA and starred in an attacking trio alongside Brian Diego Fuentes and Bambang Pamungkas, helping the club win a historic treble of Malaysia Premier League, Malaysia Cup and Malaysia FA Cup.

He returned to Perak FA in time for the 2007 season. He forged a lethal partnership with Guinean Keita Mandjou, scoring 15 of the 36 goals that were scored between them. His efforts led him to become a front-runner for the Favourite Striker Award.

Mandjou left at the start of the 2008 season, leaving Khalid to build a new partnership with Chilean Carlos Cáceres. Khalid managed to score 13 goals and emerged as Malaysian top scorer for 2 years consecutively.

He left Perak FA along with his teammate Ahmad Azlan Zainal to join Kelantan FA for the 2009 season. He then left Kelantan FA to join ATM FA for the 2010 season, but his contract was terminated and he didn't made any appearance in league. Khalid returned to Kelantan FA for the 2011 season, however he was not retained in the team for the 2012 season.

National team 
After establishing himself as a first-team player for the country in 2001, Khalid's international career was rocked when he was sacked by the then-head coach Allan Harris, along with Kamarulzaman Hassan and Azmin Azram Abdul Aziz for staying out late at a disco before the 2002 World Cup preliminary games against Qatar, Palestine and Hong Kong. In 2002, Khalid was call up for an international friendly match against five times World Cup winners Brazil. He was selected as one of the first eleven to play against Brazilian stars such as Ronaldo and Barca's Ronaldinho.

On 30 September 2002, Khalid had scored a Hattrick against the Maldives under-23 for Malaysia under-23 in 2002 Busan Asian Games and won 3-1.

Khalid is widely considered as the best target man in the country, and has been proven right by coaches such as Bertalan Bicskei, who stuck with him throughout the 2004 Tiger Cup. He eventually silenced his critics with 2 goals against archrivals Thailand, in a game in which Malaysia won 2-1. Malaysia finished at 3rd place with Khalid emerged as a second top goalscorer behind Ilham Jaya Kesuma with 6 goals in that tournament.

However, he was no longer been selected for national team after 2004 even showed outstanding performance in domestic league, especially in 2006 and 2007 with Perak FA. Khalid earn 24 international caps scoring 8 goals for Malaysia.

Despite being a maligned figure whenever he is on the pitch, he nonetheless remains one of the most recognisable faces in Malaysian football.

Career statistics

International

International Goals

Senior

Honours

Club
Perak FA
 Liga Perdana 1: 2002, 2003
 Malaysia FA Cup: 2004
 Malaysia Cup: 2000
 Piala Sumbangsih runner-up: 2001

Selangor FA
 Malaysia Premier League: 2005
 Malaysia FA Cup: 2005
 Malaysia Cup: 2005
 Piala Sumbangsih runner-up: 2006

Kelantan FA
 Malaysia FA Cup runner-up: 2009
 Malaysia Cup runner-up: 2009

International

 AFF Championship third place: 2004

Individual

 Liga Perdana 1 top scorer: 2002

References

External links 
 

Malaysian people of Malay descent
Malaysian footballers
Malaysia international footballers
Living people
1977 births
Selangor FA players
Perak F.C. players
Kelantan FA players
Sportspeople from Kuala Lumpur
Footballers at the 2002 Asian Games
Association football forwards
Asian Games competitors for Malaysia